Claudio Scajola (born 15 January 1948 in Imperia) is an Italian politician, current Mayor of Imperia.

Career
A long-time Christian Democrat, he was Mayor of Imperia during a short period in the 1980s and from 1990 to 1995, as his father and his brother had been. When Christian Democracy disbanded, he joined Forza Italia in 1995. He was then elected deputy in 1996 and was national coordinator of the party from 1996 to 2001 (and again in 2003). He also led a faction named after him, the Scajoliani.

He was minister of interior from 2001 to 2002 and later minister of productive activities in the third cabinet of Silvio Berlusconi. In this capacity, Scajola was a strong advocate for the Italian re-entry into commercial use of nuclear power for the generation of electricity.

He has been nicknamed SkyOla because allegedly has been using Alitalia airplanes for private use. An unnecessary air route has been created from Leonardo da Vinci-Fiumicino Airport to Villanova d'Albenga International Airport which he uses regularly for traveling from and to his parliamentary job, rarely it is used by other passengers. This scandal was exposed in 2008 by the RAI television program AnnoZero.

In April 2010 Italian newspapers wrote that Scajola, in July 2004, used €1,100,000 in slush funds to buy a flat in Rome near the Colosseum. At least €900,000 of those funds where reportedly traced as coming from Diego Anemone, a real estate developer under accusation of public servants bribing. During a press conference, the minister defended himself saying that maybe the house had been paid without his knowledge. These justifications were not deemed sufficient by public opinion and, in May 2010, Scajola resigned from office.

At the 2018 communal elections, Scajola is re-elected Mayor of Imperia, 23 years after his last mayoral experience.

Arrest
On 8 May 2014, Scajola was arrested for aiding the escape of Amedeo Matacena, an ex member of parliament accused of criminal involvement with the Calabrian 'Ndrangheta, and remains in police custody.

Notable statements
In June 2002 Scajola is in Cyprus talking to journalists and say: "Marco Biagi was only a jerk, only thinking about the renewal of his contract". Marco Biagi was killed by terrorists in March 2002 and Scajola was home minister. Scajola had to resign because of this sentence on 4 July 2002. Despite this, Berlusconi continued to consider him one of the good ones.

References

External links
Official Site (in Italian)
Files about his parliamentary activities (in Italian): XIII, XIV, XV, XVI legislature

1948 births
Living people
People from Imperia
Forza Italia politicians
Italian Ministers of the Interior
Mayors of places in Liguria